Sibo may refer to:

 Sibo, a town in Sweden
 Xibe people or Sibo, a Manchu ethnic group in Xinjiang, China
 Xibe language, spoken by the Sibo people
 Small intestinal bacterial overgrowth, a disorder of the small intestine
 SIBO, an operating system used by the Psion Organiser pocket computer
Sibö, a deity of the indigenous Bribri people

See also
 Sibos (conference), an annual banking conference held in various cities around the world
Sibu (disambiguation)